Grevillea 'Orange Marmalade'  is a grevillea cultivar. It is a cross between G. glossadenia and G. venusta.

See also
 List of Grevillea cultivars

References

Cultivars of Australian plants
Orange Marmalade
Proteales of Australia
Garden plants of Australia